Phyllonorycter laurocerasi is a moth of the family Gracillariidae. It is known from Georgia and Russia.

The larvae feed on Prunus laurocerasus. They mine the leaves of their host plant. They create a lower-surface tentiform mine.

References

laurocerasi
Moths of Europe
Moths of Asia
Moths described in 1979